The 1971 Torneo Descentralizado was the 55th season of the highest division of Peruvian football. The number of teams increased from 14 to 16 teams as four teams gained promotion. The last three teams were relegated from the first division.

The national champion was Universitario. ADO, Octavio Espinosa and Porvenir Miraflores were relegated.

Teams

Results

External links
Peru 1971 season at RSSSF
Peruvian Football League News 

Tor
Peru
1971